Třebohostice is a municipality and village in Strakonice District in the South Bohemian Region of the Czech Republic. It has about 300 inhabitants.

Administrative parts
The village of Zadní Zborovice is an administrative part of Třebohostice.

References

Villages in Strakonice District